Michael Mark may refer to:

 Michael Mark (actor) (1886–1975), Russian-born American film actor
 Michael Mark (musician), American musician, composer, and actor
 Michael Mark (rugby league), Papua New Guinean rugby league footballer

See also

Michael Marks (disambiguation)
Mark (surname)